The 2016–17 FA Youth Cup was the 65th edition of the FA Youth Cup. The defending champions were Chelsea and they retained the trophy for the fourth year in a row after a 6–2 aggregate victory over Manchester City in the final.

Calendar

Qualifying rounds

Preliminary round

First round qualifying

Second round qualifying

Third round qualifying

First round

Second round

Third round

Fourth round

Fifth round

Quarter-finals

Semi-finals

|}

First leg

Second leg

Final

|}

First leg

Second leg

See also
 2016–17 Premier League Cup
 2016–17 FA Cup
 2016–17 Professional U18 Development League

References

External links
 The FA Youth Cup at The Football Association official website

FA Youth Cup seasons
Fa Cup
England